Chimes: Upon Reading V. M. Shukshin is a choral symphony by Valery Gavrilin. It was composed 1978—1982 and premiered in 1984. The texts, inspired after a reading of Vasily Shukshin, are compiled from folk poetry, Albina Shulgina, and Gavrilin himself. The premiere in 1984 was seen as a turning away from European themes to Russian themes in Gavrilin's output.

Instrumentation
The instrumentation for Chimes is as follows:

Woodwind
Oboe

Percussion
Timpani
Triangle
Snare drum
Whip
Cymbals
Bass drum
Tam-tam
Tubular bells

Voices
Soprano solo
Tenor solo
Speaker (male voice)
SATB choir (sopranos dived into two sections)

Movements

References

1984 compositions
Choral symphonies